Matt Eastin (born June 3, 1979) is a Utah-based music video, documentary, and commercial director and editor.  He is perhaps best known for his work with Imagine Dragons, directing and editing the Wrecked, Follow You, Cutthroat, Believer, Whatever it Takes, Roots, On Top of the World and Shots (Broiler Remix) music videos.  Eastin also co-created and directed the AUDIO-FILES TV series, which featured documentaries and live performances of indie bands in their home cities, such as The Head & the Heart, Low, Neon Trees, and Mates of State.  Matt got his start by doing free music videos for bands in the Utah music scene, which were part of a collective production team called The Occidental Saloon.  Matt has also directed and edited a number of commercial campaigns for Lagoon, an amusement park in Utah.  In 2017, Matt partnered with Adobe Premiere and Imagine Dragons during the Adobe "Make The Cut" contest, which allowed fans and amateur editors to re-edit the raw footage from the Imagine Dragons "Believer" video for prizes.

Eastin's name is credited publicly, on a display case at The Hard Rock Hotel and Casino in Las Vegas, where the astronaut suits, and other props from the Imagine Dragons "On Top of the World" music video have been on exhibit since early 2014.

In 2018, the "Whatever it Takes" music video, by Imagine Dragons, that Eastin co-directed with Aaron Hymes, won an MTV VMA for "Best Rock Video."

References

American music video directors
Living people
1979 births